Marina Vikentyevna Lobatch (born 26 June 1970) is a former Soviet Individual rhythmic gymnast. She is the 1988 Olympic champion, 1987 World gold medalist in hoop and 1988 European gold medalist in rope and ribbon.

Career 
Lobatch started the sport in 1977 at age 7. Lobatch was among the leading Soviet gymnasts of the 1980s (along with Tatiana Druchinina, Galina Beloglazova, and Dalia Kutkaitė); she won gold in the hoop competition, and bronze in the rope and clubs competitions, during the 1987 World Championships. However, in the all-around event she finished behind three Bulgarian gymnasts who won gold and tied silver, leaving her in fourth tied with teammate Anna Kotchneva. In 1988, Lobatch finished 4th at the European Championships, but won gold in the rope (tied with two others) and ribbon competitions,
and bronze in the clubs competition.

Her biggest success was during the 1988 Seoul Olympics. She received perfect tens on all of her routines during the qualifying and final rounds of the all-around competition. Her closest competitors also received perfect scores during the finals, but had not received perfect scores in the qualifying round (as a tie-breaker the qualifying scores were divided by two and added onto the final round scores). The final scores were very close, with Lobatch receiving 60.000, Adriana Dunavska receiving 59.950, and Olexandra Tymoshenko receiving 59.875.

Lobatch is still the youngest Olympic Champion in rhythmic gymnastics at 18 years, 3 months and 6 days, despite never being crowned European or World All-around Champion. She retired in 1989 at the age of 19.

In 1993, Lobatch went to Lamezia Terme, Italy to prepare gymnasts Larissa Lukyanenko and Tatiana Ogrizko for the Italia Serie A. During training they competed for the local club Gascal in the Serie A. Lobatch returned to Belarus in April 1994. In 1998 she was invited to Italy by the Gascal club, where she spent several weeks with her family.

Lobatch is a coach and judge for the Belarusian Gymnastics Federation. She has been awarded the Order of Friendship of Peoples. She is coaching Alina Harnasko (2020 European All-around silver medalist).

Detailed Olympic results

Personal life 
She currently lives in Minsk with her husband, Dmitry Bogdanov, and their daughters, Irina and Nadya.

References

External links
 

1970 births
Living people
People from Smalyavichy
Belarusian rhythmic gymnasts
Soviet rhythmic gymnasts
Olympic gold medalists for the Soviet Union
Olympic gymnasts of the Soviet Union
Olympic medalists in gymnastics
Medalists at the 1988 Summer Olympics
Gymnasts at the 1988 Summer Olympics
Medalists at the Rhythmic Gymnastics World Championships
Sportspeople from Minsk Region